Gauri Viswanathan (born November 5, 1950) is an Indian American academic. She is the Class of 1933 Professor in the Humanities and Director of the South Asia Institute at Columbia University.

Biography 
Viswanathan was born on November 5, 1950, in Kolkata, the daughter of UN officials. She earned her bachelor's and master's degrees from the University of Delhi and her doctorate from Columbia University. Her research has focused on nineteenth-century British and colonial cultural studies.

She is the author of Masks of Conquest: Literary Study and British Rule in India (1989), which won the James Russell Lowell Prize from the Modern Language Association, and Outside the Fold: Conversion, Modernity, and Belief (1998), which won the Harry Levin Prize awarded by the American Comparative Literature Association. She also received a Guggenheim Fellowship in 1990 and was a Mellon Fellow in 1986.

References 

Living people

Columbia University faculty
Delhi University alumni
Columbia Graduate School of Arts and Sciences alumni
1950 births
People from Kolkata
American academics of Indian descent